Fairfax v Commissioner of Taxation is a High Court of Australia case that considered the scope of the taxation power in section 51(ii) of the Constitution.

Facts
The Income Tax and Social Services Contribution Assessment Act 1964, dealt with income tax and social services. Section 11 of the Act exempted certain superannuation funds from income tax if they invested in government securities. Fairfax was subject to the tax but challenged it by arguing it was a law with respect to superannuation funds, not an exercise of the taxation power.

Decision
Per Kitto J:

The Commonwealth law was in substance a law with respect to taxation. A tax does not cease to be valid because it regulates, discourages, or even definitely deters the activities taxed.

The plaintiffs argued that if superannuation funds fully undertook the law, and invested in government securities, then the Section 11 provision would result in no taxation revenue for the government. The Court however thought the issue of raising revenue was a secondary concern. The law was still concerned with taxation because it imposed a taxation obligation. The fact that the purpose was to deter superannuation funds, did not preclude it from being a matter with respect to taxation. As s51(ii) was a non-purposive head of power, like all such powers, it operates on the subject matter.

See also 

 Constitutional basis of taxation in Australia
 Australian constitutional law

References 

 Winterton, G. et al. Australian federal constitutional law: commentary and materials, 1999. LBC Information Services, Sydney.

High Court of Australia cases
1965 in Australian law
Australian constitutional law
Taxation in the Australian Constitution cases
1965 in case law